A cannonball is round shot ammunition for a cannon.

Cannonball or cannon ball may also refer to:

Biology
 Couroupita guianensis, an evergreen tree commonly called the cannonball tree
 Sphaerobolus, a genus commonly known as the cannonball fungi
 Cannonball jellyfish, a species of jellyfish

Film and television
 Cannonball (film), a 1976 film inspired by "Cannon Ball" Baker
 Cannonball (TV series), a TV show about two truck drivers, produced in Canada in 1958–59 and syndicated in the U.S. in 1959–60
 Cannonball (Australian game show)
 Cannonball (British game show)
 Cannonball (American game show)
 Hooterville Cannonball, a fictional train in the television series Petticoat Junction

Music

Albums
 Cannonball (album), by Pat Green, 2006
 Cannonball!!!, by Bleubird, 2012

Songs
 "Cannonball" (The Breeders song), 1993
 "Cannonball" (Damien Rice song), 2002; covered by Little Mix, 2011
 "Cannonball" (Duane Eddy song), 1958
 "Cannonball" (Lea Michele song), 2013
 "Cannonball" (Showtek and Justin Prime song), 2013
 "Cannonball" (Skylar Grey song), 2015
 "Cannonball" (Supertramp song), 1985
 "Cannonball" (Tom Dice song), 2017
 "Cannonball", by Brandi Carlile from The Story, 2007
 "Cannonball", by Dog Eat Dog, 2005
 "Cannonball", by Five Iron Frenzy from The End Is Near, 2004
 "Cannonball", by Grouplove from Big Mess, 2016
 "Cannonball", by Gudda Gudda, featuring Drake, 2009

People and characters
 Cannonball (nickname), a list of people
 Cannonball (comics), a Marvel Comics character associated with the X-Men
 Cannonball (G.I. Joe), in the G.I. Joe universe
 Cannonball (Transformers), the Decepticon space pirate in the Transformers toy line

Places
 Cannon Ball, North Dakota, a city
 Cannonball River, a tributary of the Missouri River
 Cannonball Cliffs, Alexander Island, Antarctica

Trains
 The Cannon Ball, a Boston & Maine Railroad train from Boston to Plymouth, New Hampshire
 The Cannonball (LIRR train), a seasonal train operated by the Long Island Rail Road along its Montauk Branch
 The Cannon Ball a train operated by the Norfolk & Western Railway with the Pennsylvania Railroad, Richmond, Fredericksburg and Potomac Railroad, and the Atlantic Coast Line Railroad, from New York to Norfolk, Virginia

Other uses
 Cannonball (diving), a diving maneuver
 Cannonball (missile), originally intended to be a US Navy anti-ship missile, later developed as an anti-tank missile
 Cannonball (novel), a novel by Joseph McElroy
 Cannonball Musical Instruments, a Salt Lake City based musical instrument manufacturer
 Cannon Ball roller coaster, a wooden roller coaster at Lake Winnepesaukah, Georgia/Tennessee border
 Cannonball problem, a mathematical problem
 Cannon Ball Route, an early auto route between Kansas City and Chicago
 Operation Cannonball, a Central Intelligence Agency operation
 Cannonball Motorcycle Club, an outlaw motorcycle club in Finland

See also
 Cannonball Run (disambiguation)
 Cannon & Ball, a British comedy double act